Ebo is an unincorporated community in Washington County, Missouri, United States. Ebo is next to Ebo Creek, the etymology of which is unknown.

Ebo is mentioned as being one of the possible sites of Renault's earliest lead mining in Missouri. The community once had Ebo Schoolhouse, now defunct.

References 

Unincorporated communities in Washington County, Missouri
Unincorporated communities in Missouri